ECMAScript is a JavaScript standard developed by Ecma International. Since 2015, major versions have been published every June.

ECMAScript 2022, the 13th and current version, was released in June 2022.

Versions

In June 2004, Ecma International published ECMA-357 standard, defining an extension to ECMAScript, known as ECMAScript for XML (E4X). Ecma also defined a "Compact Profile" for ECMAScript – known as ES-CP, or ECMA 327 – that was designed for resource-constrained devices, which was withdrawn in 2015.

4th Edition (abandoned) 
The proposed fourth edition of ECMA-262 (ECMAScript 4 or ES4) would have been the first major update to ECMAScript since the third edition was published in 1999. The specification (along with a reference implementation) was originally targeted for completion by October 2008. The first draft was dated February 1999. An overview of the language was released by the working group on 23 October 2007.

By August 2008, the ECMAScript 4th edition proposal had been scaled back into a project code named ECMAScript Harmony. Features under discussion for Harmony at the time included:
 classes,
 a module system,
 optional type annotations and static typing, probably using a structural type system,
 generators and iterators,
 destructuring assignment, and
 algebraic data types.

The intent of these features was partly to better support programming in the large, and to allow sacrificing some of the script's ability to be dynamic to improve performance. For example, Tamarin – the virtual machine for ActionScript, developed and open-sourced by Adobe – has just-in-time compilation (JIT) support for certain classes of scripts.

In addition to introducing new features, some ES3 bugs were proposed to be fixed in edition 4. These fixes and others, and support for JSON encoding/decoding, have been folded into the ECMAScript, 5th Edition specification.

Work started on Edition 4 after the ES-CP (Compact Profile) specification was completed, and continued for approximately 18 months where slow progress was made balancing the theory of Netscape's JavaScript 2 specification with the implementation experience of Microsoft's JScript .NET. After some time, the focus shifted to the ECMAScript for XML (E4X) standard. The update has not been without controversy. In late 2007, a debate between Eich, later the Mozilla Foundation's CTO, and Chris Wilson, Microsoft's platform architect for Internet Explorer, became public on a number of blogs. Wilson cautioned that because the proposed changes to ECMAScript made it backwards incompatible in some respects to earlier versions of the language, the update amounted to "breaking the Web", and that stakeholders who opposed the changes were being "hidden from view". Eich responded by stating that Wilson seemed to be "repeating falsehoods in blogs" and denied that there was attempt to suppress dissent and challenged critics to give specific examples of incompatibility. He pointed out that Microsoft Silverlight and Adobe AIR rely on C# and ActionScript 3 respectively, both of which are larger and more complex than ECMAScript Edition 3.

5th Edition – ECMAScript 2009 
Yahoo, Microsoft, Google, and other 4th edition dissenters formed their own subcommittee to design a less ambitious update of ECMAScript 3, tentatively named ECMAScript 3.1. This edition would focus on security and library updates, with a large emphasis on compatibility. After the aforementioned public sparring, the ECMAScript 3.1 and ECMAScript 4 teams agreed on a compromise: the two editions would be worked on, in parallel, with coordination between the teams to ensure that ECMAScript 3.1 remains a strict subset of ECMAScript 4 in both semantics and syntax.

However, the differing philosophies in each team resulted in repeated breakages of the subset rule, and it remained doubtful that the ECMAScript 4 dissenters would ever support or implement ECMAScript 4 in the future. After over a year since the disagreement over the future of ECMAScript within the Ecma Technical Committee 39, the two teams reached a new compromise in July 2008: Brendan Eich announced that Ecma TC39 would focus work on the ECMAScript 3.1 (later renamed to ECMAScript, 5th Edition) project with full collaboration of all parties, and vendors would target at least two interoperable implementations by early 2009. In April 2009, Ecma TC39 published the "final" draft of the 5th edition and announced that testing of interoperable implementations was expected to be completed by mid-July. On December 3, 2009, ECMA-262 5th edition was published.

Additions include JSON, String.trim() to easily remove whitespaces surrounding a string ("  example  " to "example"), String.charAt() to return a single character from a given position in a string, and Array.isArray(). A comma after the final pair of values in an object (var example = { "property1":"value1", "property2":"value2", }) also no longer causes a syntax error.

6th Edition – ECMAScript 2015 
The 6th edition, ECMAScript 6 (ES6) and later renamed to ECMAScript 2015, was finalized in June 2015. This update adds significant new syntax for writing complex applications, including class declarations (class Foo { ... } ), ES6 modules like  import * as moduleName from "..."; export const Foo, but defines them semantically in the same terms as ECMAScript 5 strict mode. Other new features include iterators and for...of loops, Python-style generators, arrow function expression (() => {...} ), let keyword for local declarations, const keyword for constant local declarations, binary data, typed arrays, new collections (maps, sets and WeakMap), promises, number and math enhancements, reflection, proxies (metaprogramming for virtual objects and wrappers) and template literals using backticks (`) for multi-line strings without escape characters. The complete list is extensive. As the first "ECMAScript Harmony" specification, it is also known as "ES6 Harmony".

7th Edition – ECMAScript 2016 
The 7th edition, or ECMAScript 2016, was finalized in June 2016. Its features include block-scoping of variables and functions, destructuring patterns (of variables), proper tail calls, exponentiation operator ** for numbers, await, async keywords for asynchronous programming (as a preparation for ES2017), and the  function.

8th Edition – ECMAScript 2017 
The 8th edition, or ECMAScript 2017, was finalized in June 2017.

9th Edition – ECMAScript 2018 
The 9th edition, or ECMAScript 2018, was finalized in June 2018. New features include the spread operator and rest parameters (...) for object literals, asynchronous iteration, Promise.prototype.finally and additions to RegExp.

The spread operator allows for the easy copying of object properties, as shown below.let object = {a: 1, b: 2}

let objectClone = Object.assign({}, object) // before ES2018
let objectClone = {...object} // ES2018 syntax

let otherObject = {c: 3, ...object}
console.log(otherObject) // -> {c: 3, a: 1, b: 2}

10th Edition – ECMAScript 2019 
The 10th edition, or ECMAScript 2019, was published in June 2019. Added features include, but are not limited to, Array.prototype.flat, Array.prototype.flatMap, changes to Array.sort and Object.fromEntries.

 is now guaranteed to be stable, meaning that elements with the same sorting precedence will appear in the same order in the sorted array. Array.prototype.flat(depth=1) flattens an array to a specified depth, meaning that all subarray elements (up to the specified depth) are concatenated recursively.

Another notable change is that so-called catch binding became optional.

11th Edition – ECMAScript 2020 
The 11th edition, or ECMAScript 2020, was published in June 2020. In addition to new functions, this version introduces a BigInt primitive type for arbitrary-sized integers, the nullish coalescing operator, and the globalThis object.

BigInts are created either with the  constructor or with the syntax , where "n" is placed after the number literal. BigInts allow the representation and manipulation of integers beyond , while Numbers are represented by a double-precision 64-bit IEEE 754 value.

This contrasts with the  operator, which would return  for all "falsy" values, such as the ones below.undefined ?? "string" // -> "string"
null ?? "string" // -> "string"
false ?? "string" // -> false
NaN ?? "string" // -> NaN

Optional chaining makes it possible to access the nested properties of an object without having an AND check at each level. If any of the properties are not present,  will be .

12th Edition – ECMAScript 2021 
The 12th edition, ECMAScript 2021, was published in June 2021.

13th Edition – ECMAScript 2022 
The 13th edition, ECMAScript 2022, was published in June 2022.

ES.Next 
ES.Next is a dynamic name that refers to whatever the next version is at the time of writing. ES.Next features include finished proposals (aka "stage 4 proposals") as listed at finished proposals that are not part of a ratified specification. The language committee follows a "living spec" model, so these changes are part of the standard, and ratification is a formality.

References

External links

ISO standards
ISO/IEC 22275:2018

ECMA standards
ECMAScript Language Specification 
3rd Edition, December 1999: PDF
Edition 3 Final, March 2000: PDF
4th Edition (overview): PDF
4th Edition (final draft): HTML, PDF
5th Edition, December 2009: PDF
5.1 Edition, June 2011: HTML, PDF
6th Edition, June 2015 (ECMAScript 2015 Language Specification): HTML, PDF
7th Edition, June 2016 (ECMAScript 2016 Language Specification): HTML, PDF
8th edition, June 2017 (ECMAScript 2017 Language Specification): HTML, PDF
9th edition, June 2018 (ECMAScript 2018 Language Specification): HTML,PDF
10th edition, June 2019 (ECMAScript 2019 Language Specification): HTML,PDF
11th edition, June 2020 (ECMAScript 2020 Language Specification): HTML,PDF
12th edition, June 2021 (ECMAScript 2021 Language Specification): HTML,PDF
13th edition, June 2022 (ECMAScript 2022 Language specification):HTML
ECMA-290 ECMAScript Components Specification (June 1999)
ECMA-327 ECMAScript 3rd Edition Compact Profile (June 2001)
ECMA-357 ECMAScript for XML (E4X) Specification (June 2004)

Ecma standards
JavaScript